Captain Kennedy may refer to:

William Kennedy (explorer) (1814–1890), Canadian fur trader, politician, and historian who captained the steamship Isabella
Edward Coverley Kennedy (1879–1939), Royal Navy sailor
Inga Kennedy (born 1962), Scottish nurse and senior Royal Navy officer
Arthur Kennedy (governor) (1809–1883), British colonial administrator who served as governor of a number of British colonies
Archibald Kennedy, 11th Earl of Cassilis (bef. 1736–died 1794), Scottish peer who lived in the English colony of New York
Captain Kennedy, a band that performed at the 2011 Forfey Festival
“Captain Kennedy”, a song by Neil Young from the album Hawks & Doves